Laoshan may refer to the following in China:

Laoshan District (崂山区), in Qingdao, Shandong
Mount Lao (崂山), mountain in Qingdao
Laoshan Subdistrict (老山街道), division of Shijingshan District, Beijing
 The Laoshan (goat) breed of goat from Shandong